Jorge Rodolfo Soracco Ríos (27 July 1927 – 25 October 2018) was a Peruvian basketball player. He competed in the men's tournament at the 1948 Summer Olympics.

References

External links
 

1927 births
2018 deaths
Peruvian men's basketball players
Olympic basketball players of Peru
Basketball players at the 1948 Summer Olympics
Sportspeople from Lima
20th-century Peruvian people